James Calvin Graham (born June 7, 1944) is an American retired professional basketball player who spent one season in the American Basketball Association (ABA) as a member of the Pittsburgh Pipers during the 1967–68 season. He attended Gannon University.

External links
 

1944 births
Living people
American men's basketball players
Gannon Golden Knights men's basketball players
Guards (basketball)
Pittsburgh Pipers players